Siegfried Lehmann (Hebrew: זיגפריד להמן) (4 January 1892—13 June 1958) was an Israeli educator and founder and director of the Ben Shemen Youth Village.

Biography
Lehmann was born in Berlin, Germany, in 1892 to an assimilated Jewish family. After finishing high school, he entered a medical school where he studied together with Albert Einstein. During World War I he served as a physician in the German Army. After the war he became a Zionist and a Socialist.

He founded a Jewish orphanage (Jüdisches Volksheim) in Berlin in 1916, and opened a shelter for Jewish war orphans in Kaunas in 1919. In 1927, he immigrated to Mandate Palestine, now Israel, and founded the Ben Shemen Youth Village, a large agricultural boarding school, situated adjacent to the moshav in Ben Shemen.
He directed Ben Shemen Youth Village from 1927 to 1957 and received the 1957 Israel Prize in Education for it.
In 1940, he was imprisoned by the British Mandate authorities because they found  arms depots at the village (the "Ben Shemen trial").
He died in 1958.

Awards
 In 1957, Lehmann was awarded the Israel Prize in education.

References

See also 
List of Israel Prize recipients
Lehman

Chazon Umoreshet, Biography by Aya Lehman Schlair in Hebrew,2010

German Jewish military personnel of World War I
German emigrants to Mandatory Palestine
Israel Prize in education recipients
Israeli educators
Jewish educators
Physicians from Berlin
1892 births
1958 deaths